Caught in the Act (abbreviated to C.I.T.A.) is a half English, half Dutch boy band.

History

1992–1995: Formation and early years
Caught in the Act was established by Dutch record producer Cees van Leeuwen in 1992 with the four original members of the group, Lee Baxter and Benjamin Boyce from England along with Eloy de Jong and Bastiaan Ragas from the Netherlands. The band released the non-album singles "Hey you", "Gonna make U mine" and "Take me to the limit".

1995–1996: "...Of love"
Their first hit was in 1995, Love is everywhere, which reached number 8 in Switzerland. Not enormously successful in the Netherlands, the band was extremely popular in Germany where they appeared on the soap opera Gute Zeiten, schlechte Zeiten. Their debut album "...Of love" was released along with the three more singles "My arms keep missing you", "Let this love begin" and "You know". "My Arms Keep Missing You" was included in the dance compilation album "Dyna Club Mix".

1996–1997: "Forever friends"
Soon their second studio album was released, called "Forever friends" along with the three singles "Don't walk away", "Ain't just another story" and "Bring back the love". The album and the singles had similar success as the previous releases.

1997–1998: "Vibe"
The band's third studio album "Vibe" was released in 1997. It included the two successful singles "Do it for love" and "Babe" (a cover version of Styx's 1979 hit of the same name).

1998: "We belong together" and sudden split
After three studio albums, the band released a greatest hits compilation, called "We belong together: 6 years of success". The album featured the two singles "Hold on" and "Baby come back". Before their sudden split in 1998, Caught in the Act released four studio albums, one compilation and fifteen singles and sold over 15 million records in total.

1998: "Solo 4 C.I.T.A."
When Caught in the Act disbanded, they released one final studio album "Solo 4 C.I.T.A." and the final single "I wanna stay with you forever", which video contained footage of all previous music videos. The album itself also contained solo material sung by each band member.

Post-break up
Boyce was the first one to release solo material such as his self-titled debut album "Benjamin Boyce" and two singles "10.000 light years" and "Changes" in the late of 1999. He also collaborated with 2-4 Family on their track "Everytime you go away" on their only album "Family business". Ragas released singles such as "Still believe in love", "Only you", "Alles" with Tooske Breugem and "Unbelievable" and more and albums such as the Dutch-languaged album "Zin". He also starred as leading actor in various musicals. In 2004, Boyce released the single "Across the sea" with Francesco Diaz. Baxter has gone on to a career as an actor, sometimes credited as Collin Baxter.

Discography

Studio albums

Compilations

Singles

References

Notes
  Julia Edenhofer: Take me to the limit. Die rasante Karriere von Caught in the Act. Heyne, München 1996, 
  Susanne Baumann: Caught in the Act. die Traumboys hautnah. Econ, Düsseldorf 1996, 
  Selina Sander: Caught in the Act. Fan Book. Falken, Niedernhausen/Ts. 1997, 
  Michael Fuchs-Gamböck, Lea Lieven: Caught in the Act. Freunde für immer. Goldmann, München 1996, 
  Rosi & Reni Kieffer: Das große CITA Fanbuch. Heel, Königswinter 1997, 
  Kurt Koelsch: Caught in the Act. Poster Book. Bassermann, 
  Rosi & Reni Kieffer: Friends forever. Caught in the Act. vgs, Köln 1996,

External links

 

Dutch boy bands
English boy bands
Vocal quartets
Schlager groups
Musical groups established in 1992